Kahtukorha (also Romanized as  Kahtūkorhā, Kohtūkarhā, and Kahtū Karhā; also known as Kahtūkarā and Kahtūkorā) is a village in Madvarat Rural District, in the Central District of Shahr-e Babak County, Kerman Province, Iran. At the 2006 census, its population was 11, in 4 families.

References 

Populated places in Shahr-e Babak County